Yosi Horikawa is a Japanese musician and sound designer. He is characterized by making music with nature sounds. Horikawa has released several EPs and two albums with music labels Eklektic Records, First Word Records, and Borrowed Scenery.

Career
Yosi Horikawa grew up in Osaka in a family little involved in music. At the age of 12, he was interested in making music, but he did not have musical instruments. He sought things that sounded good around him, such as rice boxes, soup stock bags, and chopsticks, and he recorded them with home Tape decks. Horikawa's main influences were new jack swing, West Coast Hip-Hop, Pete Rock, Teddy Riley, and DJ Premier. He moved to Tokyo at 18 to study architecture and acoustics at a university.

His first EP, Touch, was released on French label Eklektic Records. In 2011, he contributed the track "Passion" to the Nihon Kizuna compilation for tsunami relief. In 2011, he participated in Red Bull Music Academy Madrid. In 2012, he launched the EP Wandering from London's First Word Records. In 2013, he launched its first album Vapor, considered by Fact Magazine and Japan Times as one of the Best Albums of 2013.

In 2019, Horikawa launched, with Daisuke Tanabe, his last album Spaces on label Borrow Scenery.

Discography

References

Japanese musicians
Year of birth missing (living people)
Living people